"Hard Luck Blues" is a 1950 song by Roy Brown and His Mighty-Mighty Men.   The single, backed by The Griffin Brothers Orchestra, was the most successful on Brown's career, reaching the number-one spot on the US Billboard R&B chart.  "Hard Luck Blues" reflected the ritual expression of inward griefs.

References

1950 singles
Blues songs
1950 songs
Song articles with missing songwriters